PP-12 Rawalpindi-VI is a Constituency of Provincial Assembly of Punjab.

Area
 Rawalpindi Qanungo Halqa of Rawalpindi Tehsil
 The following Patwar Circles of Chaklala Cantt
 Lakhan-l
 Lakhan-II
 Dhamyal
 Dhama Rawalpindi and
 Jarahi of Rawalpindi District.

1985-1988:PP-7 (Rawalpindi-VII)
General elections were held on March 12, 1985.(PP-7 – Rawalpindi) Chaudhary Muhammad Khalid won this seat
|-

1988-1990:PP-7 (Rawalpindi-VII)

General elections were held on November 30, 1988 (PP-7 – Rawalpindi) Chaudhary Muhammad Khalid won this seat

1990-1993:PP-7 (Rawalpindi-VII)

General elections were held on November 5, 1990 (PP-7 – Rawalpindi) Shaukat Mahmood Bhatti won this seat

1993-1997:PP-7 (Rawalpindi-VII)

General elections were held on November 30, 1993 (PP-7 – Rawalpindi) Chaudhary Muhammad Khalid won this seat

1997-2002:PP-7 (Rawalpindi-VII)

General elections were held on February 18, 1997 (PP-7 – Rawalpindi) Shaukat Mahmood Bhatti won this seat

2002-2008:PP-7 (Rawalpindi-VII)
General elections were held on November 25, 2002

2008-2013:PP-7 (Rawalpindi-VII)

2013:PP-7 (Rawalpindi-VII)
General elections were held on 11 May 2013. Muhammad Siddique Khan won this seat with 48,440 votes.

All candidates receiving over 1,000 votes are listed here.

2018 PP-12 (Rawalpindi-VII) 

General elections are scheduled to be held on 25 July 2018.

See also
 PP-11 Rawalpindi-V
 PP-13 Rawalpindi-VII

References

External links
 Election commission Pakistan's official website
 Awazoday.com check result
 Official Website of Government of Punjab

R